Wellfield Middle School is located in Whitley Bay, North Tyneside, serving the areas of Wellfield, Earsdon and Monkseaton. In 2015 it had about 300 pupils on its roll from the ages of 9 up to 13.

History 
Prior to 1972 there was a primary school in Wellfield. With Northumberland's creation of a three-tier education system, the school was divided into a First School (South Wellfield First School) and a Middle school (originally called South Wellfield Middle School).

In 1993, South Wellfield Middle School and other schools were threatened with closure by North Tyneside Council with a view to reduce surplus places. After a campaign by staff, parents and pupils to keep the school open, the school successfully applied in 1994 to become one of the few grant-maintained schools in North East England.

Following this success, the school changed its name in September 1994 to Wellfield Middle School (Grant-Maintained). When grant-maintained status was abolished, it became known simply as Wellfield Middle School.

SATs 
Pupils at Wellfield complete their KS2 SATs tests in Year 6. Wellfield, along with all other schools in England, have their results published on the DfES website.

Famous Former Pupils 
 Laura Spence, the schoolgirl from Whitley Bay who became the centre of a major political row in 2000 when Chancellor of the Exchequer Gordon Brown criticised the decision made by Oxford University not to award her a place to study medicine.

References

External links 
 Wellfield Middle School Official Website

Middle schools in the Metropolitan Borough of North Tyneside
Whitley Bay
Community schools in the Metropolitan Borough of North Tyneside